GEO is a family of educational monthly magazines similar to the National Geographic magazine. It is known for its detailed reports and pictures.

History and profile
The first edition appeared in Germany in 1976. Since then, the magazine has been published in Bulgaria, Croatia, Czech Republic, Estonia, Finland, France (first international edition), Greece, Hungary, India (publication ceased in 2013), Italy, Japan, Korea, Lithuania, Latvia, Romania, Russia (publication ceased in 2018), Slovakia, Slovenia, Spain, and Turkey. The current circulation figure in France and Germany is over 500,000.

GEO is published by Gruner + Jahr, a publishing house owned by Bertelsmann.

The French edition was launched in 1979 and is published monthly by Prisma Presse. The German version has several special editions (line extensions): GEO Saison, a multi thematic magazine dedicated to tourism, GEO Special a mono thematic magazine about individual countries or cities, GEO Wissen and GEO Kompakt mono thematic magazines focused on science issues, GEO Epoche about history and GEOlino for children. The Russian edition features GEOTraveller, GEOFocus on science and history, GEOлёнок for children and The Best of GEO.

Besides the magazines, GEO'''s portfolio consists of merchandising products like GEO illustrated books, a GEO encyclopedia, GEO calendars and others.

On 26 July 2013, Outlook Group announced that GEO, along with People and Marie Claire'', would cease publication in India and the license would not be renewed.

Geo Television
The magazine has its own television channel called Geo Television, operated in the DACH region.

References

External links

German edition
Croatian edition
Czech edition
Finnish edition
French edition (ISSN 0220-8245)
Greek edition
Hungarian edition
Italian edition (ISSN 1122-3308)
Lithuanian edition
Romanian edition
Russian edition
Slovak edition
Slovenian edition
Spanish edition
Turkish edition

1976 establishments in West Germany
Education magazines
Geographic magazines
German-language magazines
Prisma Media
History magazines
Magazines established in 1976
Magazines published in Hamburg
Monthly magazines published in Germany
Nature magazines
Science and technology magazines
Gruner + Jahr